The 2nd constituency of the Pyrénées-Orientales (French: Deuxième circonscription des Pyrénées-Orientales) is a French legislative constituency in the Pyrénées-Orientales département. Like the other 576 French constituencies, it elects one MP using the two-round system, with a run-off if no candidate receives over 50% of the vote in the first round.

Description

The 2nd constituency of Pyrénées-Orientales covers the northern portion of the department along with a coastal strip along the Mediterranean Sea. The constituency also includes a small part of Perpignan.

In the 80s and 90s the seat swung broadly inline with the national trend, however since 2002 it has returned conservative deputies. In 2017 the constituency joined seven others in electing a National Front deputy.

Assembly Members

Election results

2022

 
 
 
 
 
 
|-
| colspan="8" bgcolor="#E9E9E9"|
|-

2017

|- style="background-color:#E9E9E9;text-align:center;"
! colspan="2" rowspan="2" style="text-align:left;" | Candidate
! rowspan="2" colspan="2" style="text-align:left;" | Party
! colspan="2" | 1st round
! colspan="2" | 2nd round
|- style="background-color:#E9E9E9;text-align:center;"
! width="75" | Votes
! width="30" | %
! width="75" | Votes
! width="30" | %
|-
| style="background-color:" |
| style="text-align:left;" | Louis Aliot
| style="text-align:left;" | National Front
| FN
| 
| 30.80
| 
| 50.56
|-
| style="background-color:" |
| style="text-align:left;" | Christine Espert
| style="text-align:left;" | Democratic Movement
| MoDem
| 
| 29.11
| 
| 49.44
|-
| style="background-color:" |
| style="text-align:left;" | Fernand Siré
| style="text-align:left;" | The Republicans
| LR
| 
| 13.30
| colspan="2" style="text-align:left;" |
|-
| style="background-color:" |
| style="text-align:left;" | Catherine David
| style="text-align:left;" | La France Insoumise
| FI
| 
| 9.87
| colspan="2" style="text-align:left;" |
|-
| style="background-color:" |
| style="text-align:left;" | Marie-Pierre Sadourny
| style="text-align:left;" | Socialist Party
| PS
| 
| 4.69
| colspan="2" style="text-align:left;" |
|-
| style="background-color:" |
| style="text-align:left;" | Pascal Egido
| style="text-align:left;" | Communist Party
| PCF
| 
| 3.28
| colspan="2" style="text-align:left;" |
|-
| style="background-color:" |
| style="text-align:left;" | Alexis Abat
| style="text-align:left;" | Regionalist
| REG
| 
| 2.48
| colspan="2" style="text-align:left;" |
|-
| style="background-color:" |
| style="text-align:left;" | Dominique Labis
| style="text-align:left;" | Ecologist
| ECO
| 
| 1.08
| colspan="2" style="text-align:left;" |
|-
| style="background-color:" |
| style="text-align:left;" | Solange Rodier
| style="text-align:left;" | Debout la France
| DLF
| 
| 1.07
| colspan="2" style="text-align:left;" |
|-
| style="background-color:" |
| style="text-align:left;" | Bérengère Batailler
| style="text-align:left;" | Ecologist
| ECO
| 
| 1.00
| colspan="2" style="text-align:left;" |
|-
| style="background-color:" |
| style="text-align:left;" | Michel Roig
| style="text-align:left;" | Independent
| DIV
| 
| 0.97
| colspan="2" style="text-align:left;" |
|-
| style="background-color:" |
| style="text-align:left;" | Laurent Perrie
| style="text-align:left;" | Regionalist
| REG
| 
| 0.92
| colspan="2" style="text-align:left;" |
|-
| style="background-color:" |
| style="text-align:left;" | Liberto Plana
| style="text-align:left;" | Far Left
| EXG
| 
| 0.79
| colspan="2" style="text-align:left;" |
|-
| style="background-color:" |
| style="text-align:left;" | Patrick Ramirez
| style="text-align:left;" | Independent
| DIV
| 
| 0.65
| colspan="2" style="text-align:left;" |
|-
| colspan="8" style="background-color:#E9E9E9;"|
|- style="font-weight:bold"
| colspan="4" style="text-align:left;" | Total
| 
| 100%
| 
| 100%
|-
| colspan="8" style="background-color:#E9E9E9;"|
|-
| colspan="4" style="text-align:left;" | Registered voters
| 
| style="background-color:#E9E9E9;"|
| 
| style="background-color:#E9E9E9;"|
|-
| colspan="4" style="text-align:left;" | Blank/Void ballots
| 
| 2.74%
| 
| 8.18%
|-
| colspan="4" style="text-align:left;" | Turnout
| 
| 49.17%
| 
| 45.65%
|-
| colspan="4" style="text-align:left;" | Abstentions
| 
| 50.83%
| 
| 54.35%
|-
| colspan="8" style="background-color:#E9E9E9;"|
|- style="font-weight:bold"
| colspan="6" style="text-align:left;" | Result
| colspan="2" style="background-color:" | FN GAIN FROM UMP
|}

2012

|- style="background-color:#E9E9E9;text-align:center;"
! colspan="2" rowspan="2" style="text-align:left;" | Candidate
! rowspan="2" colspan="2" style="text-align:left;" | Party
! colspan="2" | 1st round
! colspan="2" | 2nd round
|- style="background-color:#E9E9E9;text-align:center;"
! width="75" | Votes
! width="30" | %
! width="75" | Votes
! width="30" | %
|-
| style="background-color:" |
| style="text-align:left;" | Toussainte Calabrese
| style="text-align:left;" | Socialist Party
| PS
| 
| 32.14
| 
| 49.51
|-
| style="background-color:" |
| style="text-align:left;" | Fernand Sire
| style="text-align:left;" | Union for a Popular Movement
| UMP
| 
| 27.70
| 
| 50.49
|-
| style="background-color:" |
| style="text-align:left;" | Irina Kortanek
| style="text-align:left;" | National Front
| FN
| 
| 23.59
| colspan="2" style="text-align:left;" |
|-
| style="background-color:" |
| style="text-align:left;" | Françoise Fiter
| style="text-align:left;" | Left Front
| FG
| 
| 6.58
| colspan="2" style="text-align:left;" |
|-
| style="background-color:" |
| style="text-align:left;" | Joseph Puig
| style="text-align:left;" | The Centre for France
| CEN
| 
| 5.33
| colspan="2" style="text-align:left;" |
|-
| style="background-color:" |
| style="text-align:left;" | Marie-Paule Ricard
| style="text-align:left;" | Europe Ecology – The Greens
| EELV
| 
| 1.77
| colspan="2" style="text-align:left;" |
|-
| style="background-color:" |
| style="text-align:left;" | Audrey Castanet
| style="text-align:left;" | Ecologist
| ECO
| 
| 0.92
| colspan="2" style="text-align:left;" |
|-
| style="background-color:" |
| style="text-align:left;" | Liberto Plana
| style="text-align:left;" | Far Left
| EXG
| 
| 0.57
| colspan="2" style="text-align:left;" |
|-
| style="background-color:" |
| style="text-align:left;" | Cécile Sorbier
| style="text-align:left;" | Ecologist
| ECO
| 
| 0.54
| colspan="2" style="text-align:left;" |
|-
| style="background-color:" |
| style="text-align:left;" | Pascale Clavel
| style="text-align:left;" | Other
| AUT
| 
| 0.43
| colspan="2" style="text-align:left;" |
|-
| style="background-color:" |
| style="text-align:left;" | Annie Rideau
| style="text-align:left;" | Far Left
| EXG
| 
| 0.42
| colspan="2" style="text-align:left;" |
|-
| style="background-color:" |
| style="text-align:left;" | Gérald Brachet
| style="text-align:left;" | Other
| AUT
| 
| 0.01
| colspan="2" style="text-align:left;" |
|-
| colspan="8" style="background-color:#E9E9E9;"|
|- style="font-weight:bold"
| colspan="4" style="text-align:left;" | Total
| 
| 100%
| 
| 100%
|-
| colspan="8" style="background-color:#E9E9E9;"|
|-
| colspan="4" style="text-align:left;" | Registered voters
| 
| style="background-color:#E9E9E9;"|
| 
| style="background-color:#E9E9E9;"|
|-
| colspan="4" style="text-align:left;" | Blank/Void ballots
| 
| 1.84%
| 
| 4.98%
|-
| colspan="4" style="text-align:left;" | Turnout
| 
| 60.71%
| 
| 60.11%
|-
| colspan="4" style="text-align:left;" | Abstentions
| 
| 39.29%
| 
| 39.89%
|-
| colspan="8" style="background-color:#E9E9E9;"|
|- style="font-weight:bold"
| colspan="6" style="text-align:left;" | Result
| colspan="2" style="background-color:" | UMP HOLD
|}

2007

|- style="background-color:#E9E9E9;text-align:center;"
! colspan="2" rowspan="2" style="text-align:left;" | Candidate
! rowspan="2" colspan="2" style="text-align:left;" | Party
! colspan="2" | 1st round
! colspan="2" | 2nd round
|- style="background-color:#E9E9E9;text-align:center;"
! width="75" | Votes
! width="30" | %
! width="75" | Votes
! width="30" | %
|-
| style="background-color:" |
| style="text-align:left;" | Arlette Franco
| style="text-align:left;" | Union for a Popular Movement
| UMP
| 
| 48.31
| 
| 59.78
|-
| style="background-color:" |
| style="text-align:left;" | Renee Soum
| style="text-align:left;" | Socialist Party
| PS
| 
| 21.80
| 
| 40.22
|-
| style="background-color:" |
| style="text-align:left;" | Pierre Aloy
| style="text-align:left;" | National Front
| FN
| 
| 6.75
| colspan="2" style="text-align:left;" |
|-
| style="background-color:" |
| style="text-align:left;" | Maryse Lapergue
| style="text-align:left;" | UDF-Democratic Movement
| UDF-MoDem
| 
| 5.98
| colspan="2" style="text-align:left;" |
|-
| style="background-color:" |
| style="text-align:left;" | Nadine Pons
| style="text-align:left;" | Communist Party
| PCF
| 
| 4.78
| colspan="2" style="text-align:left;" |
|-
| style="background-color:" |
| style="text-align:left;" | Ghislaine Zaparty
| style="text-align:left;" | Far Left
| EXG
| 
| 2.32
| colspan="2" style="text-align:left;" |
|-
| style="background-color:" |
| style="text-align:left;" | Katia Mingo
| style="text-align:left;" | The Greens
| LV
| 
| 1.90
| colspan="2" style="text-align:left;" |
|-
| style="background-color:" |
| style="text-align:left;" | Jocelyne Roge-Balaguer
| style="text-align:left;" | Hunting, Fishing, Nature and Traditions
| CPNT
| 
| 1.86
| colspan="2" style="text-align:left;" |
|-
| style="background-color:" |
| style="text-align:left;" | Audrey Castanet
| style="text-align:left;" | Ecologist
| ECO
| 
| 1.42
| colspan="2" style="text-align:left;" |
|-
| style="background-color:" |
| style="text-align:left;" | Roger Foinels
| style="text-align:left;" | Movement for France
| MPF
| 
| 1.41
| colspan="2" style="text-align:left;" |
|-
| style="background-color:" |
| style="text-align:left;" | Daniel Canellas
| style="text-align:left;" | Regionalist
| REG
| 
| 0.99
| colspan="2" style="text-align:left;" |
|-
| style="background-color:" |
| style="text-align:left;" | Liberto Plana
| style="text-align:left;" | Far Left
| EXG
| 
| 0.84
| colspan="2" style="text-align:left;" |
|-
| style="background-color:" |
| style="text-align:left;" | Simone Thomas
| style="text-align:left;" | Far Right
| EXD
| 
| 0.70
| colspan="2" style="text-align:left;" |
|-
| style="background-color:" |
| style="text-align:left;" | Daniel Drouillard
| style="text-align:left;" | Far Left
| EXG
| 
| 0.47
| colspan="2" style="text-align:left;" |
|-
| style="background-color:" |
| style="text-align:left;" | Pascal Le Jolly
| style="text-align:left;" | Independent
| DIV
| 
| 0.45
| colspan="2" style="text-align:left;" |
|-
| style="background-color:" |
| style="text-align:left;" | Gabriela Koval
| style="text-align:left;" | Independent
| DIV
| 
| 0.00
| colspan="2" style="text-align:left;" |
|-
| colspan="8" style="background-color:#E9E9E9;"|
|- style="font-weight:bold"
| colspan="4" style="text-align:left;" | Total
| 
| 100%
| 
| 100%
|-
| colspan="8" style="background-color:#E9E9E9;"|
|-
| colspan="4" style="text-align:left;" | Registered voters
| 
| style="background-color:#E9E9E9;"|
| 
| style="background-color:#E9E9E9;"|
|-
| colspan="4" style="text-align:left;" | Blank/Void ballots
| 
| 2.47%
| 
| 4.65%
|-
| colspan="4" style="text-align:left;" | Turnout
| 
| 61.51%
| 
| 60.98%
|-
| colspan="4" style="text-align:left;" | Abstentions
| 
| 38.49%
| 
| 39.02%
|-
| colspan="8" style="background-color:#E9E9E9;"|
|- style="font-weight:bold"
| colspan="6" style="text-align:left;" | Result
| colspan="2" style="background-color:" | UMP HOLD
|}

2002

|- style="background-color:#E9E9E9;text-align:center;"
! colspan="2" rowspan="2" style="text-align:left;" | Candidate
! rowspan="2" colspan="2" style="text-align:left;" | Party
! colspan="2" | 1st round
! colspan="2" | 2nd round
|- style="background-color:#E9E9E9;text-align:center;"
! width="75" | Votes
! width="30" | %
! width="75" | Votes
! width="30" | %
|-
| style="background-color:" |
| style="text-align:left;" | Jean Codognes
| style="text-align:left;" | Socialist Party
| PS
| 
| 33.92
| 
| 49.14
|-
| style="background-color:" |
| style="text-align:left;" | Arlette Franco
| style="text-align:left;" | Union for a Presidential Majority
| UMP
| 
| 33.74
| 
| 50.86
|-
| style="background-color:" |
| style="text-align:left;" | Maryse Besse
| style="text-align:left;" | National Front
| FN
| 
| 18.07
| colspan="2" style="text-align:left;" |
|-
| style="background-color:" |
| style="text-align:left;" | Alain Esclope
| style="text-align:left;" | Hunting, Fishing, Nature and Traditions
| CPNT
| 
| 4.39
| colspan="2" style="text-align:left;" |
|-
| style="background-color:" |
| style="text-align:left;" | Audrey Schall
| style="text-align:left;" | Independent
| DIV
| 
| 1.76
| colspan="2" style="text-align:left;" |
|-
| style="background-color:" |
| style="text-align:left;" | Ghislaine Zaparty
| style="text-align:left;" | Revolutionary Communist League
| LCR
| 
| 1.50
| colspan="2" style="text-align:left;" |
|-
| style="background-color:" |
| style="text-align:left;" | Roger Chenaye
| style="text-align:left;" | National Republican Movement
| MNR
| 
| 1.15
| colspan="2" style="text-align:left;" |
|-
| style="background-color:" |
| style="text-align:left;" | M. Françoise Bile Centene
| style="text-align:left;" | Republican Pole
| PR
| 
| 1.11
| colspan="2" style="text-align:left;" |
|-
| style="background-color:" |
| style="text-align:left;" | Jaume Roure
| style="text-align:left;" | Regionalist
| REG
| 
| 1.05
| colspan="2" style="text-align:left;" |
|-
| style="background-color:" |
| style="text-align:left;" | Liberto Plana
| style="text-align:left;" | Workers' Struggle
| LO
| 
| 1.04
| colspan="2" style="text-align:left;" |
|-
| style="background-color:" |
| style="text-align:left;" | Roger Foinels
| style="text-align:left;" | Movement for France
| MPF
| 
| 0.93
| colspan="2" style="text-align:left;" |
|-
| style="background-color:" |
| style="text-align:left;" | Laetitia Sanchez
| style="text-align:left;" | Independent
| DIV
| 
| 0.73
| colspan="2" style="text-align:left;" |
|-
| style="background-color:" |
| style="text-align:left;" | Anne Legrout
| style="text-align:left;" | Ecologist
| ECO
| 
| 0.33
| colspan="2" style="text-align:left;" |
|-
| style="background-color:" |
| style="text-align:left;" | Daniel Drouillard
| style="text-align:left;" | Far Left
| EXG
| 
| 0.28
| colspan="2" style="text-align:left;" |
|-
| colspan="8" style="background-color:#E9E9E9;"|
|- style="font-weight:bold"
| colspan="4" style="text-align:left;" | Total
| 
| 100%
| 
| 100%
|-
| colspan="8" style="background-color:#E9E9E9;"|
|-
| colspan="4" style="text-align:left;" | Registered voters
| 
| style="background-color:#E9E9E9;"|
| 
| style="background-color:#E9E9E9;"|
|-
| colspan="4" style="text-align:left;" | Blank/Void ballots
| 
| 2.40%
| 
| 5.30%
|-
| colspan="4" style="text-align:left;" | Turnout
| 
| 65.47%
| 
| 65.53%
|-
| colspan="4" style="text-align:left;" | Abstentions
| 
| 34.53%
| 
| 34.47%
|-
| colspan="8" style="background-color:#E9E9E9;"|
|- style="font-weight:bold"
| colspan="6" style="text-align:left;" | Result
| colspan="2" style="background-color:" | UMP GAIN FROM PS
|}

References

2